Kalanad  is a village in Kasaragod district in the state of Kerala, India.

Demographics
 India census, Kalanad had a population of 15755 with 7495 males and 8260 females.

Education
Sa-Adiya English Medium Residential Senior Secondary School is a major educational organization of the area.

References

Suburbs of Kasaragod